Montevallo is an unincorporated community in southeast Vernon County, Missouri, United States. The community is on Missouri Route E between Milo (10 miles west) and Olympia four miles to the east in adjacent Cedar County. Nevada is approximately 16 miles to the northeast.

History
Montevallo was platted in the 1850s. The community was severely damaged during the Civil War. The original town site, located approximately one and one-half miles northwest of the present town, is now known as "Old Montevallo". The entire town was moved to its present location sometime after the Civil War. A post office was established at Montevallo in 1858, and remained in operation until being discontinued in 1968. Montevallo is derived from Italian words for the hill in the valley.

References

Unincorporated communities in Missouri
Unincorporated communities in Vernon County, Missouri